is a railway station in the city of Okazaki, Aichi, Japan, operated by Meitetsu.

Lines
Utō Station is served by the Meitetsu Nagoya Main Line and is 34.8 kilometers from the terminus of the line at Toyohashi Station.

Station layout
The station has two opposed side platforms connected by a footbridge. The station has automated ticket machines, Manaca automated turnstiles and is unattended.

Platforms

Adjacent stations

Station history
Utō Station was opened on 1 June 1923 as a station on the privately held Aichi Electric Railway. The Aichi Electric Railway was acquired by the Meitetsu Group on 1 August 1935.

Passenger statistics
In fiscal 2017, the station was used by an average of 3,353 passengers daily.

Surrounding area
 Yahagi Nishi Elementary School
 Utō Kannon

See also
 List of Railway Stations in Japan

References

External links

 Official web page 

Railway stations in Japan opened in 1923
Railway stations in Aichi Prefecture
Stations of Nagoya Railroad
Okazaki, Aichi